Typocerus lugubris is a species of flower longhorn in the beetle family Cerambycidae. It is found in North America. It has been observed mating on Saururus cernuus, with the female consuming pollen from the plant.

References

Further reading

 
 

Lepturinae
Articles created by Qbugbot
Beetles described in 1824
Beetles of North America